Henrique de Senna Fernandes (October 15, 1923, Macao – October 4, 2010, Macao) was a Macanese writer. Born in 1923 as one of 11 siblings to an old Macanese family, who settled in Macau over 250 years ago, he studied law at the University of Coimbra before becoming a writer. His work, written in  Portuguese, evokes the atmosphere of the 1930s, 1940s and 1950s in the territory. Often focussing on the lives of characters of mixed racial origins, like the author himself, his work represents a unique viewpoint on the evolution of the territory in the twentieth century.

Besides writing he was a teacher and director at the Pedro Nolasco Commercial School. From 1998 to 2009 he was resident of the General Assembly of CAM, operator of Macau International Airport.

In 2006 he received an honorary doctorate from the University of Macau and Medal of Cultural Merit in 2001.

Works
Nam Van - Contos de Macau 1978
, adapted into a film of the same name
Amor e Dedinhos de Pé (Love and Tiny Toes) 1986, adapted into a film of the same name
Mong Há 1998
Pai das Orquideas (Father of the Orchids)
A-Chan, A Tancareira

References

1923 births
2010 deaths
Macanese people
Macau writers
Portuguese-language writers
University of Coimbra alumni